WGUY (1230 AM) is a radio station licensed to Veazie, Maine, United States. It is owned by Port Broadcasting, LLC. The station signed on in November 2011 as a simulcast of co-owned WNZS. In May 2012 WGUY broke away from the WNZS simulcast, and began simulcasting on 94.1 FM and broadcasting an oldies format.

WGUY is one of the flagship stations of the Black Bear Sports Network, carrying University of Maine basketball, baseball, and softball. In the event of a conflict between the Maine Black Bears' men's and women's basketball teams, the women's game is relocated to co-owned WBAN (formerly WNZS) or WCYR.

On December 30, 2015, WGUY changed their format from oldies to a simulcast of soft adult contemporary-formatted WRMO 93.7 FM.

On December 1, 2016, with the station being sold to Port Broadcasting, WGUY and W231CH broke the simulcast of WRMO. WGUY reverted to its oldies format and W231CH began simulcasting WBAN, which inherited the soft AC format. WRMO switched to the Maine Public Classical Network.

Previous logo

References

External links

Oldies radio stations in the United States
Radio stations established in 2011
2011 establishments in Maine
Mass media in Penobscot County, Maine
GUY